Christopher Michael Bate FRS (born 21 December 1943) is an Emeritus Professor of developmental biology at the Department of Zoology and fellow at King's College, Cambridge.

The son of John Gordon Bate, M.B. Ch.B., an R.A.F. doctor, of Holmbury St Mary, Dorking, his paternal grandfather was Herbert Bate, Dean of York 1932–41. His mother, Rachel Denise, was daughter of Samuel Ronald Courthope Bosanquet, KC, recorder of Walsall, Chancellor of the Diocese of Hertford; a great-uncle on the maternal side, William Temple, was Archbishop of Canterbury from 1942 to 1944.

Mike Bate is a member of European Molecular Biology Organization. His research is concerned with the way in which the machinery underlying coordinated movement is assembled during embryonic development. This involves both the analysis of the way in which muscles are assembled, specified and patterned, and the investigation of the way in which motor circuits are generated and begin to function.

Bate worked with the fruit fly, Drosophila melanogaster and applied a combination of genetic, molecular and cellular techniques to bear on the issues of neuromuscular development. Mike Bate also worked on the genetic basis of myoblast recruitment and fusion and on an electrophysiological and structural analysis of the way in which functional properties are acquired by embryonic neurons.

References

External links
 Website at the Department of Zoology
 "Michael Bate Interview", Alan Macfarlane, 2 July 2008

English biologists
1943 births
Members of the European Molecular Biology Organization
Living people
Fellows of King's College, Cambridge
Fellows of the Royal Society
Foreign Fellows of the Indian National Science Academy
Place of birth missing (living people)
Date of birth missing (living people)